John Howard Moore (December 4, 1862 – June 17, 1916) was an American zoologist, philosopher, educator, humanitarian and socialist. He is considered to be an early, yet neglected, proponent of animal rights and ethical vegetarianism, and was a leading figure in the American humanitarian movement. Moore was a prolific writer, authoring numerous articles, books, essays, pamphlets on topics including animal rights, education, ethics, evolutionary biology, humanitarianism, socialism, temperance, utilitarianism and vegetarianism. He also lectured on many of these subjects and was widely regarded as a talented orator, earning the name the "silver tongue of Kansas" for his lectures on prohibition.

Moore was born near Rockville, Indiana, in 1862 and spent his formative years in Linden, Missouri. Raised as a Christian, this instilled in him the anthropocentric belief that non-human animals existed for the benefit of humans. At college, Moore was introduced to Darwin's theory of evolution, which led him to develop an ethic that rejected both Christianity and anthropocentrism, and recognized the intrinsic value of animals; he adopted vegetarianism as an extension of this belief. While studying zoology at the University of Chicago, he became a socialist, helped form the university's Vegetarian Eating Club and won a national oratorical contest on prohibition. Moore was an influential member of the Chicago Vegetarian Society and attempted to model the organization as an American version of the Humanitarian League, a British organization that Moore was also a member of. In 1895, Moore delivered a speech that was published by the Chicago Vegetarian Society as Why I Am a Vegetarian. For the rest of his life, Moore worked as a teacher in Chicago, while continuing to lecture and write.

In 1899, Moore published his first book Better-World Philosophy, in which he described what he saw as fundamental problems in the world and his ideal arrangement of the universe. In 1906, his best-known work The Universal Kinship was published, in which he advocated for a sentiocentric philosophy he called the doctrine of Universal Kinship, based on the shared evolutionary kinship between all sentient beings. Moore expanded on his ideas in The New Ethics the following year. In response to the passing of a law in Illinois prescribing the teaching of morals in public schools, Moore published supporting education material, in the form of two books and a pamphlet. This was followed by two books on evolution: The Law of Biogenesis (1914) and Savage Survivals (1916). After having suffered from chronic illness and depression for several years, Moore killed himself at the age of 53 in Jackson Park, Chicago.

Biography

Early life and education 

John Howard Moore was born on December 4, 1862, near Rockville, Indiana. Moore was the eldest of the six children of William A. Moore and Mary Moore (née Barger). At the age of six months, the Moore family moved to Linden, Missouri. During the first 30 years of his life, Moore and his family moved between Kansas, Missouri and Iowa.

Moore had a Christian upbringing, which instilled in him the anthropocentric belief that humans were created by God to have dominion over the Earth and its inhabitants. Growing up on a farm, Moore was fond of hunting and this fondness was shared by the people around him; he later reflected that he and his community saw animals as existing to be used for whatever purpose was seen fit.

Moore studied at High Bank school till the age of 17, before studying for one year at a college in Rock Port, Missouri. He then studied at Oskaloosa College (now defunct), in Iowa, from 1880 to 1884, but did not graduate. Moore went on to study at Drake University. Studying science introduced Moore to Darwin's theory of evolution, which led to him to reject Christianity, in favour of an ethic based on Darwin's theory which recognized the intrinsic value of animals as independent of their value to humans.

In 1884, he became an examiner for the Board of Teachers for Mitchell County, Kansas. The following year, Moore was struck by lightning, receiving burns to his arm and chest and temporarily losing his sight and capacity for speech; he recovered after six days of bed rest. For the rest of his life, Moore suffered from severe headaches as a result of the injury. In 1886, he unsuccessfully ran for a seat in the United States House of Representatives, coming last out of five. Around this time, he became a vegetarian for ethical reasons.

In Cawker City, Kansas, Moore studied law under C. H. Hawkins. In 1889, he was employed by the National Lecture Bureau, delivering lectures in a manner which led him to be known as the "silver tongue of Kansas"; he was also described as a "youthful Luther" and was celebrated for both his oratory and singing voice. Moore delivered lectures in Kansas, Missouri and Iowa.

In 1890, Moore published his first pamphlet A Race of Somnambulists, in which he criticized the cruelty of humans towards the animal world. He spent the summer of the same year in Chautauqua, New York, studying voice culture in singing and speaking at the Chautauqua Institution.

From 1890 to 1893, Moore continued to work as a lecturer. He also gave lectures on behalf of the Women's Christian Temperance Union. Around this time, Moore, who was living on a farm to the south of Cawker City, worked as a reporter for The Beloit Daily Call, sending in rural correspondence about happenings in his local area.

In 1894, Moore started at the University of Chicago with advanced academic standing. While studying there, he became a socialist, and helped form the Vegetarian Eating Club at the university, serving as president in 1895 and the following year as purveyor; he was also vice president of the university's prohibition club.

Moore was an influential member of the Chicago Vegetarian Society and the Humanitarian League, a British radical advocacy group; under his direction, he modelled the Society as an American version of the League. In 1895, Moore delivered a speech in front of the society, published in the same year as Why I Am a Vegetarian, in which he explained his reasoning for not eating meat. A month after the speech, Moore took first honors in the University of Chicago Prohibition Club's annual oratory contest for his oration "The Scourge of the Republic". That April, he represented the university at the state prohibition contest in Wheaton, Illinois, again winning first honors. He went on to win first honors at the national contest in Cleveland. In a newspaper profile, Moore was described as a passionate supporter of women's suffrage, with curly hair and soulful eyes.

Moore graduated in April 1896, earning an A.B. degree in zoology. That summer, he accepted the chair of sociology at Wisconsin State University, lecturing on the topic of social progress, before continuing to teach at the university.

In 1898, Moore was given a full-page column in the Chicago Vegetarian, the Chicago Vegetarian Society's journal, which started in 1896; this increased his influence on the society and its overall message. In the same year, Moore started teaching at Crane Technical High School; he retained this position for the remainder of his life, while also teaching at other schools in Chicago, including Calumet High School and Hyde Park High School.

In 1899, he married Jennie Louise Darrow (1866–1955), in Racine, Wisconsin. She was an elementary school teacher, a fellow advocate for animal rights and vegetarianism, and the sister of renowned lawyer Clarence Darrow. The couple soon returned to Chicago.

Later life and career 

In 1899, Moore published his first book, Better-World Philosophy, to mixed reviews. In the book, he expressed a longing to change how humans perceive the world and his view that all beings are interconnected. Moore argued that sentience is a requirement for ethics and that because non-human animals have this capacity, ethical consideration should be extended to them. The book was endorsed by Lester F. Ward and David S. Jordan. It also brought Moore to the attention of Henry S. Salt, the founder of the Humanitarian League, and author of Animals' Rights Considered in Relation to Social Progress, who wrote a favorable review of the book. Sustained efforts were made by the League and its allies, including the publisher G. Bell & Sons and The Animals' Friend, to promote and distribute Moore's works in Britain. Following the review, Salt began a correspondence with Moore that developed into a strong friendship.

Moore was a fierce critic of American imperialism and America's actions in the Philippine–American War, publishing an article entitled "America's Apostasy", in 1899.

Moore published The Universal Kinship in 1906. In the book, he explored the physical, psychical and ethical relationship between humans and other animals, arguing that all beings possess rights, and that the Golden Rule should be apply to all beings. The book received several favourable reviews. It was endorsed by Mark Twain, Jack London, Eugene V. Debs, and Mona Caird. Henry S. Salt, later described the book as the "best ever written in the humanitarian cause." Salt and Moore worked together to popularize Moore's doctrine within the humane movement; this was largely unsuccessful.

Moore was a close friend of May Walden Kerr, the wife of Charles H. Kerr—the publisher of many of Moore's books. Following the Kerr's divorce in 1904, Moore and Walden continued their correspondence and from time to time Moore and his wife vacationed with Walden and her daughter.

In November 1906, Moore's speech "The Cost of a Skin" sparked controversy at the American Humane Association's convention. In the speech, Moore denounced wearing fur and feathers for fashion as "conscienceless and inhumane". The audience reaction was mixed, with some applauding enthusiastically and others remaining silent; two women left the room before the speech was finished. The speech was later published as a chapter in The New Ethics (1907) and as a pamphlet by the Animals' Friend Society of London.

In 1907, Moore published, to acclaim, The New Ethics, in which he explored the expansion of ethics based on the biological implications of Darwin's theory of evolution. Moore accepted the challenge of changing anthropocentric perceptions, arguing that while such views have developed over the course of generations, both individuals and societies are in a state of constant growth and evolution. He expressed confidence that humans would evolve past their current stage of selfishness.

As well as his work as a high school teacher and author, Moore gave frequent lectures on vegetarianism, the humane treatment of animals, anti-vivisectionism, evolution and ethics. He also authored articles and pamphlets for humane organizations and journals, including the Chicago Vegetarian Society, Humanitarian League, Millennium Guild, Massachusetts SPCA, American Anti-Vivisection Society, and American Humane Association. Moore additionally wrote in support of the temperance movement, and humane education.

In 1908, Moore taught courses on elementary zoology, physiographic ecology and the evolution of domestic animals at the University of Chicago for three quarters. In October of that year, Moore endorsed Eugene V. Debs' presidential run, giving a speech in front of the Young People's Socialist League. In the following year, he denounced Theodore Roosevelt and his hunting expedition to Africa, describing Roosevelt as having "done more in the last six months to dehumanise mankind than all the humane societies can do to counteract it in years."

In 1909, a law was passed in Illinois prescribing teaching of morals in public schools for 30 minutes each week. Contrary to his fellow teachers, Moore was pleased by the law and began preparing supporting educational materials. He published Ethics and Education, in 1912, as an aid for teachers who were having trouble implementing the new educational requirements. Before the book's publication, Moore sparked controversy when he made available extracts of the book which were critical of the courts and marriage. In an interview, Moore defended the content of the book, inviting the board of education to investigate him if necessary. In the same year, he published High-School Ethics: Book One, which was intended to form the first part of a four-year high school course covering theoretical and practical ethics and covered a variety of topics including the ethics of school life; properly caring for pets; women's rights; birds; where sealskin, ivory and other animal products are sourced from; and good habits. Moore also published a pamphlet titled The Ethics of School Life, which was based on a lesson that Moore gave to high-school students.

Moore wrote to Salt on 25 March 1911 about his experience of depression and a breakdown from overwork. He told Salt that the books he had written might not result in much, but that he felt he put a lot of effort into producing them.

In February 1912, a meeting of the Schoolmasters' Club of Chicago, of which Moore was a member, was disrupted because they did not agree with his views; Moore responded: "I am a radical and a socialist, but I do not allow my radicalism nor my socialism to enter into my teachings."

Moore delivered a speech at the International Anti-vivisection and Animal protection Congress, held in Washington D.C, in 1913; in the speech, he claimed that vivisection and the consumption of meat are both a product of anthropocentrism and that Darwin's On the Origin of Species had made any notion of human superiority or uniqueness untenable and ethically indefensible.

Moore opposed the Chicago Board of Education's move to stop teaching sex hygiene, between 1913 and 1914. He wrote a letter to the board in favor of teaching the topic. In January 1914, Moore gave a speech on the topic in Chicago, at Hull House. The Board later dropped the change.

In 1914, Moore published The Law of Biogenesis: Being Two Lessons on the Origin of Human Nature, which consisted of lectures developed for lessons at Crane Technical High School, describing the mental and physical features of biogenesis—the process of how beings repeat the evolutionary development of their ancestors.

Moore published Savage Survivals in 1916, a compilation of his lectures delivered at Crane Technical High School. Made-up of five sections covering the evolution and survival of domesticated animals, the savage ancestry of humans and an analysis from an ethical perspective of those surviving traits in humans considered to be civilized.

In June 1916, Moore published an article critical of religion, entitled "The Source of Religion", describing it as "an anachronism today, with our science and understanding". Moore's last book The Life of Napoleon was finished, but not published.

Death 

On June 17, 1916, at the age of 53, Moore died after shooting himself in the head with a revolver on Wooded Island in Jackson Park, Chicago. He had visited the island regularly to observe and study birds. Moore had struggled for many years with a long illness and chronic pain from an abdominal operation, in 1911, for gallstones. He had also expressed continuing despondency at human indifference towards the suffering of their fellow animals. In a suicide note found on his body by a police officer, he had written:The long struggle is ended. I must pass away. Good-by. Oh, men are so cold and hard and half conscious toward their suffering fellows. Nobody understands. O my mother, and O my little girl! What will become of you? And the poor four-footed! May the long years be merciful! Take me to my river. There, where the wild birds sing and the waters go on and on, alone in my groves, forever. O, Tess, forgive me. O, forgive me, please!Moore's death was ruled a suicide, due to a "temporary fit of insanity". His grief-stricken wife requested that Moore's body be cremated and his ashes sent to Mobile County, Alabama, to be buried in the land near Moore's river. His brother-in-law, Clarence Darrow, who was devastated by Moore's death, delivered a eulogy at his funeral, describing him as a "dead dreamer" who had died while "suffering under a temporary fit of sanity"; the eulogy was later published. Contrary to his wife's request, Moore's remains were returned to his old home near Cawker City, and he was buried in Excelsior Cemetery, Mitchell County, Kansas.

Legacy 

An obituary published soon after Moore's death, in the Chicago Tribune, labelled Moore a misanthrope. The obituary in the Humanitarian League's journal The Humanitarian, described Moore, in much more positive terms, as "one of the most devoted and distinguished humanitarians with whom the League has had the honor of being connected." Louis S. Vineburg, who had met Moore in early 1910 at one of Moore's lectures for the Young People's Socialist League, published a personal recollection in the International Socialist Review.

Henry S. Salt, Moore's long-time friend, felt that Moore had good reason for his suicide and was scornful of how timidly his death was covered in the majority of English animal advocacy journals. Salt dedicated his 1923 book The Story of My Cousins to Moore and in his 1930 autobiography Company I Have Kept, he reflected on the strength of their friendship, despite the fact that they never met in person. A selection of Moore's letters to Salt was included in the appendix of the 1992 edition of The Universal Kinship (edited by Charles R. Magel).

Jack London, who had endorsed The Universal Kinship, and in his personal copy of the book marked the passage: "All beings are ends; no creatures are means. All beings have not equal rights, neither have all men; but all have rights", was greatly moved by Moore's death, writing at the head of a printed copy of Darrow's eulogy for Moore's funeral: "Disappointment like what made Wayland (Appeal to Reason) kill himself and many like me resign."

Due to the promotion and dissemination efforts of the Humanitarian League, G. Bell & Sons and The Animals Friend, Moore is considered to have possessed "a wider and readier acceptance of his views" in Britain than in the United States.

Contemporary reception 
Moore has been recognized as an early, but neglected, advocate for ethical vegetarianism; Rod Preece described Moore's ethical vegetarian advocacy as "ahead of his time", as it appears to not have had "any direct influence on the American intelligentsia." Preece also highlighted Moore, along with Thomas Hardy and Henry S. Salt, as writers before World War I, who connected Darwinian evolution with animal ethics.

Moore's ethical approach has been compared to Albert Schweitzer and Peter Singer, with Moore's views identified as anticipating Singer's analysis of speciesism. Donna L. Davey asserts that: "The recurring themes of Moore's works are today the foundation of the modern animal-rights movement." James J. Copp describes Moore as "one of the leading activists in the ethical treatment of animals in the early twentieth century." Bernard Unti argues that Moore's The Universal Kinship sets him apart as the "first American intellectual in the realm of animal rights." Animal rights activist Henry Spira cited Moore as an example of a leftist who wasn't uncomfortable about advocating for animal rights.

Simon Brooman and Debbie Legge argue that Moore "correctly predicted that the way in which animals were treated in his time would come to be regarded as purely anthropocentric exercises of human dominion to be replaced, in large part, by a new philosophy which recognises the 'unity and consanguinity' of all organic life." The environmental historian Roderick Nash argues that both Moore and Edward Payson Evans, "deserve more recognition than they have received as the first professional philosophers in the United States to look beyond anthropocentrism."

Gary K. Jarvis argues that unlike the British humanitarian movement, the American movement had never successfully taken hold and that following Ernest Crosby's death, in 1907, Moore had represented the remainder of the movement, which meant that his death effectively ended it; Jarvis also contends that World War I was what ultimately brought the end to the wider humanitarian movement. Jarvis also challenges the labelling of Moore as a misanthrope, arguing that Moore's criticism of anthropocentrism and Western civilization for promoting it was incorrectly perceived as misanthropic.

Selections of Moore's works were included in Jon Wynne-Tyson's 1985 book, The Extended Circle: A Dictionary of Humane Thought. Mark Gold cited Moore and Henry S. Salt as the two main inspirations for his 1995 book, Animal Rights: Extending the Circle of Compassion.

Criticism 
Moore's last published book, Savage Survivals, has been criticized as an example of scientific racism by the prehistoric archaeologist Robin Dennell. Mark Pittenger argues that Moore's racism was influenced by Herbert Spencer's The Principles of Sociology and that similar views were held by contemporary American socialists. Gary K. Jarvis describes Moore as a critic of social Darwinism, asserting: "Moore argued that social Darwinists derived their beliefs from the worst examples that evolution offered, not the best."

Selected publications

Articles

Books

Pamphlets 

 A Race of Somnambulists (Mount Lebanon, N.Y.: Lebanon Press, 1890)
 Why I Am a Vegetarian: An Address Delivered before the Chicago Vegetarian Society (Chicago: Frances L. Dusenberry, 1895)
 America's Apostasy (Chicago: The Ward Waugh Company, 1899)
 Clerical Sportsmen: A Protest Against the Vacation Pastime of Ministers of the Gospel (Chicago: Chicago Vegetarian)
 The Cost of a Skin (London: Animal Defence and Anti-Vivisection Society)
 The Logic of Humanitarianism
 Humane Teaching in Schools (London: Animals' Friend Society, 1911)
 The Care of Illegitimate Children in Chicago (Chicago: Juvenile Protective Association of Chicago, 1912)
 The Ethics of School Life: A Lesson Given at the Crane Technical High School, Chicago, in Accordance with the Law Requiring the Teaching of Morals in the Public Schools of Illinois (London: G. Bell & Sons, 1912)

Translations

See also 
 List of animal rights advocates

Notes

References

Further reading

External links 

 
 
 
 J. Howard Moore at Animal Rights Library
 Letters to and from J. Howard Moore at The Clarence Darrow Digital Collection
 Photograph of J. Howard Moore and his wife Jennie

1862 births
1916 suicides
19th-century American biographers
19th-century American educators
19th-century American essayists
19th-century American journalists
19th-century American male singers
19th-century American singers
19th-century American male writers
19th-century American non-fiction writers
19th-century American philosophers
19th-century American zoologists
19th-century social scientists
20th-century American biographers
20th-century American educators
20th-century American essayists
20th-century American journalists
20th-century American male singers
20th-century American singers
20th-century American male writers
20th-century American philosophers
20th-century American zoologists
20th-century social scientists
American animal rights activists
American animal rights scholars
American atheist writers
American atheists
American columnists
American education writers
American ethicists
American eugenicists
American former Christians
American humanitarians
American male non-fiction writers
American newspaper reporters and correspondents
American pamphleteers
American public speakers
American science writers
American socialists
American suffragists
American temperance activists
American vegetarianism activists
Animal ethicists
Anti-imperialism
Anti-vivisectionists
Birdwatchers
Burials in Kansas
Drake University alumni
Educational reformers
Education writers
Injuries from lightning strikes
Oskaloosa College alumni
People from Rockville, Indiana
Public orators
Sentientists
Schoolteachers from Indiana
Sex education advocates
Suicides by firearm in Illinois
University of Chicago alumni
University of Chicago faculty
University of Wisconsin people
Utilitarians